was a village located in Higashikubiki District, Niigata Prefecture, Japan.

As of 2003, the village had an estimated population of 4,095 and a density of 80.86 persons per km². The total area was 50.64 km².

On January 1, 2005, Uragawara, along with the town of Yasuzuka, the villages of Maki and Ōshima (all from Higashikubiki District), the towns of Itakura, Kakizaki, Ōgata and Yoshikawa, the villages of Kiyosato, Kubiki, Nakagō and Sanwa (all from Nakakubiki District), and the town of Nadachi (from Nishikubiki District), was merged into the expanded city of Jōetsu.

Transportation

Railway
 Hokuetsu Express Hokuhoku Line

  -

Highway

See also
 Jōetsu, Niigata

References

Dissolved municipalities of Niigata Prefecture
Jōetsu, Niigata